The Muzaffarabad District is one of the 10 districts of Pakistan's dependent territory of Azad Kashmir. The district is located on the banks of the Jhelum and Neelum rivers and is very hilly. The district is part of the Muzaffarabad Division, and the city of Muzaffarabad serves as the capital of Azad Kashmir. The district is bounded on the north-east by the Neelum District and the Kupwara District of Indian-administered Jammu and Kashmir, on the south-east by the Hattian Bala District, on the south by the Bagh District, and on the west by the Mansehra District and the Abbottabad District of Pakistan's Khyber Pakhtunkhwa Province.

Population and languages 
The total population of the district according to the 2017 census is 650,370.

The main language of the district, spoken by about half of its inhabitants, is generally considered to be a variety of Pahari. Though occasionally referred to in the literature as Chibhali  or Poonchi, it is locally known as Hindko. Its speakers tend to identify more with the Hindko spoken to the west, even though perceiving their speech to be only slightly different from the Pahari varieties spoken in the Bagh District and further south in Murree. The local dialect has a higher percentage of shared basic vocabulary with the central group of Pahari dialects (83–88%) than with the Hindko of the nearby Mansehra and Abbottabad districts (73–79%).

Another language spoken in the district is Gujari, native to around a third of its population. The local dialect is closely related to the Gujari varieties spoken in Hazara (83–88% similarity in basic vocabulary) and the rest of Azad Kashmir (79–86%). Kashmiri is spoken in the city of Muzaffarabad. It is distinct from, although still intelligible with, the Kashmiri of the Neelam Valley to the north. Other languages spoken include Urdu, Shina and Balti.

Administrative divisions 
The district of Muzaffarabad is administratively subdivided into two tehsils, which are subdivided into several union councils.

 Muzaffarabad Tehsil
 Pattika Tehsil

Education 

According to Pakistan District Education Ranking 2017, a report released by Alif Ailaan, Muzaffarabad is ranked at number 6 nationally, with an education score of 73.85.

However when it comes to infrastructure, Muzaffarabad ranks at 105, with a school infrastructure score of 34.29. There is a serious lack of electricity, drinking water, and boundary walls, with scores of 11.7, 27.93, and 40.09, respectively. Infrastructurewise, the schools are not conducive to study, as they lack some of the basic facilities which should be present in all schools.

72% of the schools are primary schools, and only 28% are above-primary schools. Therefore, students graduating from primary schools do not have sufficient post- primary schools to attend. This leads to a steady decrease in enrollment, especially for girls. The issues on the Taleem Do app for the area also relate to the complaint of unsatisfactory infrastructure and a lack of furniture in the school buildings.

Notes

References

Bibliography

External links 

 Information and pictures of Muzaffarabad and adjacent areas

 
Districts of Azad Kashmir